Ebony TV is a satellite television of South Sudan. It transmits via the Atlantic Bird 2 satellite in Arabic.

See also
Southern Sudan TV
Media of South Sudan
Television in South Sudan

Television stations in South Sudan